Power Glove is an Australian electronic music and synthwave duo from Melbourne, Victoria, named after the Nintendo Power Glove. They provided the soundtrack to the 1980s-influenced retro-futuristic video game Far Cry 3: Blood Dragon (April 2013). The soundtrack was met with critical acclaim.

History 

Power Glove was formed in Melbourne as the electronic music, synthwave duo (under pseudonyms) of Michael Biehn and Michael Dudikoff. In reality, the duo consists of brothers Jarome and Joel Harmsworth. The Harmsworths chose the name "Power Glove" based on a self-described obsession with Nintendo's 1989 Powerglove commercials.

The duo's music gained widespread attention with the track "Hunters" featured in the 2011 Canadian independent film Hobo with a Shotgun and the track "Vengeance" was used in the 2012 film The ABCs of Death. Their first extended play, the four-track EP 1 (a.k.a. So Bad), was released in January, 2012. Tracks by the group have appeared in various artists' compilation albums.

Career 

The duo provided the soundtrack to Far Cry 3: Blood Dragon (April 2013), which is a 1980s-influenced retro-futuristic video game. Michael Langley of CraveOnline website described that Dean Evans of Ubisoft contacted the group and asked if they would create the soundtrack to the game. The group notes that the direction for their work on the game's soundtrack was based on notably succinct instructions: "Okay guys, three words, Purple Lazer Beams".

Since releasing their second EP, EPII in 2015 the duo has scored the Blood Dragon themed iteration of the Trials video game series, Trials of the Blood Dragon which was released in June, 2016 by Ubisoft.

On May 17th of 2019, the duo released their third album, entitled "Playback". The album was self-released on digital platforms, with a vinyl print being distributed by Electronic Purification Records.

The duo also featured in the 2019 documentary film The Rise of the Synths, which explored the origins and growth of the Synthwave genre, appearing alongside various other composers from the scene, including John Carpenter, who also starred in and narrated the film.

On October 19, 2020,  Power Glove debuted on independent music label Monstercat with Mercenary, in collaboration with music producer F.O.O.L, featured in Mercenary EP.

Discography

Singles 
 Track "Fatal Affair" for "The Rise Of The Synths (Official Companion Album)"  (January 2017, self-released)
 Track "Phantasy" for "In Search Of Darkness (Original Documentary Soundtrack)"  (October 2019, self-released)
 Street Desire  (December 2020, self-released)
 Hot For Destiny  (December 2020, self-released)
 Track "Hunters" For The Original Motion Picture Soundtrack "Hobo with a Shotgun  (January 2011, self-released)
 Modern Love (Power Glove Remix) from  "Modern Love EP" by KRISTINE (November 2012, self-released)
 Aeon (w/PYLOT)  (June 2020, self-released)
 Futureland (w/Power Glove) by Sonic Mayhem  (Jule 2015, self-released)
 Bloodsport (w/Power Glove) by Tokyo Rose  (October 2021, self-released)
 Intrusion (w/Power Glove) from Album "Ruby" by Devault (March 2020, self-released)
 Mercenary (w/Power Glove) by F.O.O.L  (October 2020, self-released)
 Feel It (Music from the Netflix Original Series High Score)  (October 2020, self-released)

Albums 
 Playback (May 2019, self-released)
 2043: Volume 1 (July 2021, self-released)

EPs 
 EP1 (January 2012, self-released)
 EPII (April 2015, self-released)
 Throwback (October 2019, self-released)

Original soundtracks 
 Far Cry 3: Blood Dragon (Original Game Soundtrack) (Ubisoft Music, May 2013)
 Trials of the Blood Dragon (Original Game Soundtrack) (Ubisoft Music, June 2016)

Live Streams 
 " Digital Mirage 3 "  (December 2020, self-released)

References

External links

Synthwave groups
Australian electronic musicians